Higher Ground  is the twenty-seventh studio album by American singer Barbra Streisand, her first in four years. The album was inspired by and dedicated to Virginia Clinton Kelley. It was released in North America on November 11, 1997, and a day earlier in Europe.

The lead single, "Tell Him"—a duet with Celine Dion—was released on October 7, 1997, and become an international hit. Follow up singles "If I Could" and the title track failed to chart. "If I Could" and the title track had been previously recorded by jazz singer Nancy Wilson and Regina Belle, respectively, as well as a medley of the inspirational standards "I Believe" and "You'll Never Walk Alone", later both issued as standalone recordings by the singer. The album also contains a cover of Bernard Ighner's "Everything Must Change" which Streisand had previously recorded in sessions for her 1974 album ButterFly but remains unreleased.

Higher Ground became Streisand's eighth number-one album in the US and has sold over five million copies worldwide.

Critical reception
Bob Cannon from Entertainment Weekly opined that the "persistent" strings-and-choir treatment on these 12 tunes "reduces the whole collection to one long, lush ballad that would be more at home over The Prince of Tides closing credits." Caroline Sullivan from The Guardian wrote, "If divas there must be, let them be like Streisand, who simply eclipses wannabes like Celine Dion (whose duet with Babs, "Tell Him", appears on both women's albums). Her 54th LP, inspired by a friend's death, concerns 'the power of prayer', which led her to record uplifting tunes like "I Believe" and "You'll Never Walk Alone". Gloriously OTT, she out-does Dion, a gospel choir and entire orchestras. It all starts a bit tentatively, but she hits her breast-beating stride by the time we get to the gospelised title track, and from there till the Hebrew finale, "Avinu Malkeinu", she drains songs dry and leaves their husks behind. Fab."

Track listing
"I Believe/You'll Never Walk Alone" (Ervin Drake, Irvin Graham, Jimmy Shirl, Al Stillman/Oscar Hammerstein II, Richard Rodgers) – 6:12
"Higher Ground" (Kent Agee, Steve Dorff, George Green) – 4:24
"At the Same Time" (Ann Hampton Callaway) – 4:18
"Tell Him" (duet with Celine Dion) (Walter Afanasieff, David Foster, Linda Thompson) – 4:52
"On Holy Ground" (Geron Davis) – 6:14
"If I Could" (Ken Hirsch, Ron Miller, Marti Sharron) – 4:25
"Circle" (Jud Friedman, Cynthia Weil) – 4:15
"The Water Is Wide/Deep River" (Traditional) – 5:33
"Leading with Your Heart" (Alan Bergman, Marilyn Bergman, Marvin Hamlisch) – 3:33
"Lessons to Be Learned" (Dorothy Sea Gazeley, Marsha Malamet, Alan Rich) – 4:43
"Everything Must Change" (Bernard Ighner) – 4:05
"Avinu Malkeinu" (Max Janowski) – 4:07

Charts

Weekly charts

Year-end charts

Certifications and sales

Awards
"Tell Him" was nominated for a Grammy Award for Best Pop Collaboration with Vocals in 1998.

"I Believe" was nominated for a Grammy Award for Instrumental Arrangement in 1999.

References

1997 albums
Barbra Streisand albums
Albums produced by Walter Afanasieff
Albums produced by David Foster
Albums produced by Arif Mardin
Columbia Records albums